Pool D of the 2017 Fed Cup Americas Group II was one of four pools in the Americas Group II of the 2017 Fed Cup. Four teams competed in a round robin competition, with the top team and bottom teams proceeding to their respective sections of the play-offs: the top team played for advancement to Group I.

Standings 

Standings are determined by: 1. number of wins; 2. number of matches; 3. in two-team ties, head-to-head records; 4. in three-team ties, (a) percentage of sets won (head-to-head records if two teams remain tied), then (b) percentage of games won (head-to-head records if two teams remain tied), then (c) Fed Cup rankings.

Round-robin

Peru vs. Panama

Costa Rica vs. Bahamas

Peru vs. Bahamas

Costa Rica vs. Panama

Peru vs. Costa Rica

Bahamas vs. Panama

See also
Fed Cup structure

References

External links
 Fed Cup website

2017 Fed Cup Americas Zone